Tahir Hanley (born 5 May 1997) is a Saint Kitts and Nevis international footballer who plays for Village Superstars.

Career
Hanley made his debut for the Saint Kitts and Nevis national football team on 31 August 2016 in a 0–0 draw against Nicaragua in a friendly, coming on as a substitute for Carlos Bertie in the 46th minute.

International goals
Scores and results list Saint Kitts and Nevis' goal tally first.

Honours

Club
Village Superstars
 SKNFA Premier League: 2017–18, 2018–19

Individual
 SKNFA Premier League Finals MVP: 2017–18

Personal life
Tahir's brothers Tiran Hanley and Tishan Hanley, and cousin Alister Warner have also played international football for Saint Kitts and Nevis.

References

External links

Living people
1997 births
Saint Kitts and Nevis footballers
Saint Kitts and Nevis international footballers
Saint Kitts and Nevis youth international footballers
Association football forwards
Garden Hotspurs FC players
Village Superstars FC players